Ivar Lykke may refer to:
* Ivar Lykke (politician) (1872–1949), Norwegian politician; Prime Minister of Norway, 1926–1928
 Ivar Lykke (footballer) (1889–1955), Danish amateur footballer
 Ivar Lykke (architect) (born 1941), Norwegian architect

See also 
 Ivar Lykke Falch Lind (1870–?), Norwegian jurist and politician